Joan Helen Vickers, Baroness Vickers, DBE (3 June 1907 – 23 May 1994) was a British National Liberal and later Conservative Party politician.

Early life
Vickers was born in London on 3 June 1907, the eldest daughter of (Horace) Cecil Vickers (1882-1944), a stockbroker, and his wife, Lilian Munro Lambert Grose (1880-1923), a social worker, only daughter of Woodman Cole Grose, MBE, a civil servant. Her father's family came originally from Lincolnshire and her mother's from Cornwall.

Her father joined Nelke, Phillips & Bendix, a London stockbroking firm who counted Edward VII as one of their clients. He was elected to the Stock Exchange on 25 March 1904 and became one of their partners at their office at 4 Moorgate Street. In 1917 he set up his own firm, Vickers, da Costa, which counted Sir Winston Churchill among their clients. Her brother, Ralph Vickers was later Senior Partner of the firm.

Vickers was educated at St Monica's, Burgh Heath, Surrey, and in Paris. She was trained as a Norland Nurse, working in the Margaret Macdonald and Mary Middleton Hospital, Notting Hill and was active in politics in Battersea and Islington.  She was presented at court by Mrs Winston Churchill in 1926.  She hunted in Leicestershire, rode horses for the Irish Free State Army to ladies classes and competed in the Dublin Horse Show as a jumper. She served with the Red Cross in South East Asia and was area welfare officer of the Social Welfare Department in Malaya. She was later chairman of the Anglo-Indonesian Society. She served as a London County Councillor 1937–45 and was UK delegate to the Status of Women Commission of the United Nations.

Politics

Seeking a career in politics, she went to see Winston Churchill at Chartwell. He told her he deeply disapproved of women in politics but advised her to wear a pretty hat and join the London County Council.  In 1936 she was elected a Member of the Ladies' Grand Council of the Primrose League.

In 1937 she was elected to the London County Council, representing the Norwood division of Lambeth, and serving until 1945. In 1939 she was nominated by the British Red Cross to serve as Divisional Secretary, Lambeth Division, and in 1940 similarly for Southwark. However, during the war, she was often abroad, repatriating prisoners of war.

Overseas

Vickers worked for 14 months with the Red Cross in Indonesia, four years in British Malaya (now Malaysia) as a Social Welfare Area Officer in Negri Sembilan, Malacca and Johore. She was nominated a member of the Legislative Council in Negri Sembilan. She was a founder member of the Royal Commonwealth Society for the Blind, and started the work in Malaysia, Uganda, Tanzania, Malawi, Zambia and Kenya.

More specifically, in August 1945, she signed up to serve as Chief Welfare Officer, S.E.A.C. with the British Red Cross Society and the Order of St John. In September 1945 she arrived with six other women in Batavia, primarily to help British troops but working not only in British hospitals but also in Dutch, Indonesian and Chinese hospitals. She left in November 1946, having given great help to troops and medical units. The Dutch Red Cross were most appreciative and she was awarded the Netherlands Red Cross Order of Merit (1946). She was appointed MBE (1946). From there she went to Malaya where she served as Area Welfare Officer, Department of Social Service from January 1947 to May 1948. She visited Singapore, New Zealand and Australia in the summer of 1948.

Vickers, the only known female National Liberal politician nationally, unsuccessfully contested South Poplar at the 1945 general election. At the 1955 general election she was elected as the Member of Parliament (MP) for Plymouth Devonport, defeating the Labour candidate, Michael Foot, by 100 votes. She defeated him again in 1959 by the greatly increased majority of 6,454.  Her seat was always marginal, but she held it in the 1964, 1966 and 1970 elections.

She was considered a dedicated constituency MP, taking a house in Devonport, travelling to and from the constituency every weekend and holding regular surgeries. She never became a Minister, possibly because she always voted on conscience rather than following the whip.  She was appointed DBE in 1964. During her years as an MP, she not only addressed numerous women's issues, but also spoke on defence issues and was a zealous supporter of the Commonwealth, always keen to entertain visiting parliamentarians, parliamentary clerks from abroad, and overseas students.

She was a UK delegate to the Council of Europe in Strasbourg, and the Western European Union from 1967 to 1974. Every year she was elected by all parties to a member of the Commonwealth Parliamentary Association and the Inter-Parliamentary Union. She sat on the UK COSA Committee. She was a working member of the International Friendship League. In her life as an MP, she visited all the major Commonwealth countries for conferences, and most of the Caribbean countries, including Guyana and Belize, as well as Fiji, Tonga and Ceylon. She was on the committee of the London Centre, to which members came from India and Jamaica.

She sat until the February 1974 general election when she was defeated by Labour's David Owen.

Peerage
She was created a life peer, as Baroness Vickers, of Devonport in the County of Devon on 27 January 1975.

Arms

Fish named in her honor 
It's unusual for a politician to have a fish named after them.
 Rasbora johannae Siebert & Guiry, 1996 is named after her.

References

External links 
 
Obituary in The Independent

1907 births
1994 deaths
Members of London County Council
Conservative Party (UK) MPs for English constituencies
Female members of the Parliament of the United Kingdom for English constituencies
Life peeresses created by Elizabeth II
Conservative Party (UK) life peers
Vickers, Joan Vickers, Baroness
Members of the Parliament of the United Kingdom for constituencies in Devon
National Liberal Party (UK, 1931) politicians
UK MPs 1955–1959
UK MPs 1959–1964
UK MPs 1964–1966
UK MPs 1966–1970
UK MPs 1970–1974
UK MPs who were granted peerages
20th-century British women politicians
Politicians from Plymouth, Devon
Women councillors in England